The Man to Destroy is a 1979 Yugoslav fantasy film by Croatian film directed by Veljko Bulajić. The film was selected as the Yugoslav entry for the Best Foreign Language Film at the 52nd Academy Awards, but was not accepted as a nominee.

Cast
 Zvonimir Črnko as Farfa odnosno Scepan Mali / car Petar III
 Vladimir Popović as Kapetan Tanovic
 Charles Millot as Agent prvog reda
 Ranko Kovačević as Djakon
 Tanja Bošković as Elfa
 Dušica Žegarac as Justina
 Tanasije Uzunović as Vrhovni sotona
 Mate Ergović as Stanko Palikarda, Elfin otac
 Zuzana Kocúriková as Zefira, bludnica
 Danilo Radulović		
 Antun Nalis
 Ivica Pajer as Ruski Knez
 Ivo Vukcevic
 Veljko Mandic as Crnogorac

See also
 List of submissions to the 52nd Academy Awards for Best Foreign Language Film
 List of Yugoslav submissions for the Academy Award for Best Foreign Language Film

References

External links
 

1979 films
Croatian fantasy films
1970s Croatian-language films
Yugoslav fantasy films
Films directed by Veljko Bulajić
Films set in the 18th century